Raštani, is a village in the municipality of Kičevo, North Macedonia.

Demographics
According to the 2002 census, the village had a total of 1063 inhabitants. Ethnic groups in the village include:

Macedonians 679
Albanians 198
Romani 132
Turks 24
Vlachs 1
Serbs 2 
Others 27

References

External links

Villages in Kičevo Municipality
Albanian communities in North Macedonia